The tenth season of The Voice began airing on 8 August 2021. Due to the acquisition of 21st Century Fox by Disney, Fox Studios has been designated to Disney and Marvel productions, resulting in ITV Studios Australia becoming the new home for The Voice. In August 2020, it was announced Seven Network had picked up the series for its tenth season, set to broadcast in 2021, with Sonia Kruger returning as host. In December of the same year, Seven announced that Guy Sebastian, Jessica Mauboy, Rita Ora, and Keith Urban were the coaches, replacing Boy George, Delta Goodrem and Kelly Rowland.

The grand finale was prerecorded in April 2021, with four different endings being taped. The show was broadcast on 12 September 2021 with the winner, Bella Taylor Smith, being decided by a viewer poll. Smith’s victory marked Guy Sebastian’s first win as a coach. Smith was also the first winning artist to have a coach blocked during her blind audition.

Coaches and host 

On 15 December 2020, Seven announced Guy Sebastian would continue as a coach; Jessica Mauboy and Rita Ora were named as new coaches, replacing Boy George and Delta Goodrem; and Keith Urban, having last been a coach in the first season, returned to the coaching panel, replacing Kelly Rowland. Sonia Kruger, who left as host following the conclusion of the eighth season, returned as host following the exit of Darren McMullen and Renee Bargh.

Teams
Colour key
  Winner
  Finalist
  Eliminated in the Semifinal
  Eliminated in the Knockouts
  Eliminated in the Cut

Blind auditions
In the blind auditions this season the coaches complete their teams without a specific number of members. Also, each coach can block another two times; however, the coach who is blocked is unable to pitch for the artist.

The Cut 
In the Cut (filmed in the day after the blind auditions), each artist must immediately face their coach to prove their star power. The coaches divide their teams in groups of a specific theme and the contestants battle it out singing the same song. Each coach can only take five artists through to the Knockouts.

Knockouts 
In the knockouts, each artist must perform to their coach. After each act performs, the coaches have three options: to either send the artist straight to the semi-final, send the artist home, or make a decision at the end of the show when all artists have performed. Each coach can only take two artists through to the semis.

Finals

Semi-final
The Semi-finals episode was first broadcast on 5 September 2021. At the end of the episode, the coaches were allowed to take one artist each through to the Grand Finale.

Grand Finale 
The Grand Finale was broadcast on 12 September 2021. Each artist performed a solo song and a duet with their coach. Similar to last season, this was the only episode of the season where the results were determined by public vote and not by the coaches. With Bella Taylor Smith winning, this marks Guy's first win on The Voice.

Contestants who appeared on previous season or TV shows
Tanya George auditioned for season 4 of the show and didn't turn a chair.
Pete Murphy auditioned for season 3 of The X Factor and didn't make it to the live shows.
Seann Miley Moore competed on season 12 of The X Factor UK and placed in tenth.
Ella Monnery competed on the show's previous season and won the battle rounds. Although, left to New Zealand when borders shut from COVID-19 pandemic.
Penelope Pettigrew auditioned on the show's previous season with no chair turned.
Adrian Hood competed on season 2 of Australian Idol and was eliminated in the Wild Cards

Ratings
Colour key:
  – Highest rating during the season
  – Lowest rating during the season

References

Notes

10
2021 Australian television seasons